The Pakistan cricket team toured Bangladesh in November and December 2021 to play two Test and three Twenty20 International (T20I) matches. The Test series was part of the 2021–2023 ICC World Test Championship. The fixtures for the tour were confirmed in September 2021. Pakistan last toured Bangladesh in April and May 2015.

Pakistan won the first T20I match by four wickets, and won the second match by eight wickets to win the series with a game to play. Pakistan won the third T20I match by five wickets to win the series 3–0. Pakistan won the first Test by eight wickets. Despite rain washing out most of day two and all of day three of the second Test, Pakistan won by an innings and eight runs late on the fifth day to win the series 2–0.

Squads

Kamrul Islam Rabbi and Parvez Hossain Emon were both added to Bangladesh's squad for the third T20I match. Prior to the Test series, Khaled Ahmed and Shohidul Islam were both added to Bangladesh's squad for the first Test, with Taskin Ahmed and Shoriful Islam being unavailable due to injury. Taskin Ahmed was later added to Bangladesh's squad for the second Test, along with Mohammad Naim. Saif Hassan was ruled out of Bangladesh's squad for the second Test after being diagnosed with typhoid.

T20I series

1st T20I

2nd T20I

3rd T20I

Test series

1st Test

2nd Test

References

External links
 Series home at ESPN Cricinfo

2021 in Bangladeshi cricket
2021 in Pakistani cricket
International cricket competitions in 2021–22
Pakistani cricket tours of Bangladesh